Cheese and onion pie is a savoury dish, the basis of which is an outer layer of savoury pastry filled with a mixture of cheese, onion, herbs and sometimes potato. Many recipes contain Lancashire cheese, indicating parentage of North West England.

History
Whilst the dish may have its origins in the French tarte a l'oignon, this was a food traditionally popular with the working classes of Northern England, due to a combination of relatively cheap ingredients which provided sustenance to workers, particularly in the mining, steel, and manufacturing industries. Today there are artisan versions of the dish available, however potato is often used to bulk out cheaper mass-produced pies.

See also
List of pies

References

Savoury pies
Food combinations